Transparent is the second studio album by the American Christian duo LaRue formed by the siblings Natalie LaRue and Phillip LaRue, released on January 24, 2001 on CD.

Track listing

References

External links
 Album review at Allmusic

2001 albums
LaRue (band) albums